Smadar Lavie is a Mizrahi U.S.-Israeli anthropologist, author, and activist. She specializes in the anthropology of Egypt, Israel and Palestine, emphasizing issues of race, gender and religion. Lavie is a professor emerita of anthropology at the University of California, Davis, and a visiting scholar at the Department of Ethnic Studies, University of California, Berkeley. Lavie received her doctorate in anthropology from the University of California at Berkeley (1989) and spent nine years as assistant and associate professor of anthropology at the University of California, Davis.  She authored The Poetics of Military Occupation (UC Press, 1990), receiving the 1990 Honorable Mention of the Victor Turner Award for Ethnographic Writing, and Wrapped in the Flag of Israel: Mizrahi Single Mothers and Bureaucratic Torture (Berghahn Books 2014, University of Nebraska Press 2018) receiving the 2015 Honorable Mention of the Association of Middle East Women's Studies Book Award Competition. Wrapped in the Flag of Israel's first edition was also one of the four finalists in the 2015 Clifford Geertz Book Award Competition of the Society for the Anthropology of Religion.  She also co-edited Creativity/Anthropology (Cornell UP, 1993) and Displacement, Diaspora, and Geographies of Identity (Duke UP, 1996). Lavie won the American Studies Association's 2009 Gloria Anzaldúa Prize for her article, “Staying Put: Crossing the Palestine-Israel Border with Gloria Anzaldúa,”  published in Anthropology and Humanism (2011).  In 2013, Smadar Lavie won the “Heart at East” Honor Plaque for lifetime service to Mizraḥi communities in Israel-Palestine.

Academic life 

Lavie received her BA in Social Anthropology from the Hebrew University of Jerusalem in 1980 (Majors: Sociology and Social Anthropology; Minors: Medieval Islamic Civilization, Musicology). Lavie received her Ph.D. in Cultural Anthropology from the University of California, Berkeley in 1989 and was awarded the Malcolm H. Kerr Dissertation Award from the Middle East Studies Association for her dissertation titled, "The Poetics of Military Occupation: Mzeina Allegories of Bedouin Identity under Israeli and Egyptian Rule" which was later published by the University of California Press.

In 1990, Lavie became an Assistant Professor of Anthropology and Critical Theory at the University of California, Davis, where she was promoted to an Associate Professorship in 1994. Professor Lavie held visiting professorships at Diablo Valley College (1984), U.C. Berkeley's Fall Freshman Program (1985–89), Stanford (1994), Beit Berl's College (2001–07), Macalester College (2007-2009) University of Virginia (2009–10) and the University of Minnesota (2010–12). Professor Lavie was the recipient of residential fellowships at the Rockefeller Foundation in Bellagio (1993), Stanford Humanities Center (1993-1994)  Institute for Advanced Study, University of Minnesota (2010–11),  Cento Incontri Umani Ascona (2011), the University College Cork (2010–16), the Center for Middle Eastern Studies, U. C. Berkeley (2013-2014), the Beatrice Bain Research Group, U. C. Berkeley (2012-2016), the Simon and Riva Spatz Visiting Chair in Jewish Studies, Dalhousie University (2018/19), and the Department of Ethnic Studies, U. C. Berkeley (2016-2020).

Lavie's academic work has been characterized by as "furthering Jewish-Israeli anthropological solidarity with Palestine and helping to break the taboo of interrogating Zionism in Israeli academia."

Activism
Lavie is a member of many political, feminist and anti-racist organizations. In 2013, she won the “Heart at East” Honor Plaque for committed excellence and lifetime service to the Mizrahi communities of Israel, given by a coalition of twenty NGOs working for equal distribution of cultural funds in Israel. 21 May.

Lavie was the Co-Founder and a member of CAFIOT (the Berkeley Committee for Academic Freedom in the Israeli Occupied Territories) from 1982 to 1989.

Lavie has served a number of roles at Ahoti (Sister) for Women in Israel, Israel's feminist of color movement. From January 2003 to January 2005, she served on the board of directors. From 2002 to 2003, she both served as the liaison to the New Israel Fund and was a member of the newsletter's editorial collective. From 2003-2004, she was the liaison to the FFIPP (Educational Network for Human Rights in Palestine/Israel).

Lavie co-founded the Coalition of Women for Mothers and Children and served as co-director of this coalition of many NGOs from 2003 to 2006.

Lavie has been a member of the Mizrahi Democratic Rainbow Coalition (MDR) since 2002. She served on the Culture Committee from 2002 to 2004, the Committee on Education and the Core Curriculum from 2002 to 2003, and was the MDR Representative to the Coalition of NGOs against Racism from 2005 to 2007.

Lavie has been an Advisory Board Member of Israel's Women's Parliament since 2002.

Lavie co-founded The Mizrahi-Palestinian Coalition Against Apartheid in Israeli Anthropology (CAAIA) and was a member from 2002-2008.

Select publications

Books 
Wrapped in the Flag of Israel: Mizrahi Single Mothers and Bureaucratic Torture. Lincoln: University of Nebraska Press, 2018. (This edition contains an extensive afterword on how the recurring War on Gaza cannot be separated from Israel’s Mizrahi-Ashkenazi racial rift). 
Wrapped in the Flag of Israel: Mizrahi Single Mothers and Bureaucratic Torture. New York: Berghahn Books, 2014. Honorable Mention for the Association of Middle East Women’s Studies Book Award competition. Finalist for the CLIFFORD GEERTZ PRIZE, Society for the Anthropology of Religion. 
Displacement, Diaspora, and Geographies of Identity. With Ted Swedenburg. Durham: Duke University Press, 1996. 
Creativity/Anthropology. With Kirin Narayan and Renato Rosaldo. Ithaca: Cornell University Press, 1993. 
The Poetics of Military Occupation: Mzeina Allegories of Bedouin Identity Under Israeli and Egyptian Rule. Los Angeles: University of California Press, 1991. Honorable Mention for the VICTOR TURNER AWARD for Ethnographic Writing.

Selected articles
 2019	“Gaza 2014 and Mizrahi Feminism.” Political and Legal Anthropology Review 42(3): 85-109. 
2012	“Writing Against Identity Politics: An Essay on Gender, Race, and Bureaucratic Pain.” American Ethnologist 39(4): 780-804.
 2012	“The Knafo Chronicles: Marching on Jerusalem with Israel’s Silent Majority.” Affilia: Journal of Women and Social Work 27(3): 300-315.
 2011	“Staying Put: Crossing the Israel–Palestine Border with Gloria Anzaldúa.” Anthropology and Humanism Quarterly 36(1): 101-121. Winner of the GLORIA ANZALDÚA AWARD, the Women’s Committee of the American Studies Association. 
2011	“Mizrahi Feminism and the Question of Palestine.” Journal of Middle East Women Studies 7(2): 56-88.
 2007 	“Imperialism and Colonialism: Zionism.” Encyclopedia of Women in Islamic Cultures, Vol. 6. Leiden: Brill, pp. 9–15
 1996	“Between and Among the Boundaries of Culture: Bridging Text and Lived Experience in the Third Timespace.” Cultural Studies 10(1):154-179. 
 1995	“Border Poets: Translating by Dialogue.” In Women Writing Culture. R. Behar and D. Gordon, eds. pp. 412–427. Berkeley: University of California Press.
 1993	“Notes on the Fantastic Journey of the Hajj, His Anthropologist, and Her American Passport.” American Ethnologist (co-authored with Hajj A. and Forest Rouse) 20(2): 363-384.
 1992	“Blow-Ups in the Borderzones: Third World Israeli Authors’ Gropings for Home.” New Formations 18: 84-106.
 1989	“When Leadership Becomes Allegory: Mzeina Sheikhs and the Experience of Occupation.” Cultural Anthropology 4(2): 99-135. 
 1984	“Bedouin in Limbo: Egyptian and Israeli Development Policies in the Southern Sinai.” Antipode 16(2): 33-44. [co-authored with William C. Young]

Selected public anthropology articles
 2020	"Smadar Lavie, Wrapped in the Flag of Israel: Mizrahi Single Mothers and Bureaucratic Torture, Revised Edition with a New Afterword by the Author (New Texts Out Now)." Jadaliyya. 16 January.
2015	“Revisiting Israeli Anthropology and American Anthropology: Our “Special Relations.” Allegra Lab Anthropology Blog. 27 October.
 2015	"Smadar Lavie, Wrapped in the Flag of Israel: Mizrahi Single Mothers and Bureaucratic Torture, 1st Edition (New Texts Out Now)." Jadaliyya. 18 February.
2009 	“Sacrificing Gaza to Revive Israel’s Labor Party.” Counter Currents.19 January.
 2007	“Dry Twigs.” The Electronic Intifada. 3 August. 
 2006 	“On the Progress of Affirmative Action and Cultural Rights for Marginalized Communities in Israel.” Co-authored with Rafi Shubeli. Anthropology Newsletter. November. pp. 6–7. 
 2006 	“Operations ‘Summer Rains’ and ‘Adequate Pay’ — Yet Other Acts in the Mizrahi-Palestinian Tragedy.” Co-authored with Reuven Abarjel, co-founder of Israel’s Black Panthers. Counter Currents. 
 2005 	“Rachel Gamliel of the Ma‘abari Family, My Granny.” Beirut Independent Media Center.
 2005 “Israeli Anthropology and American Anthropology.” Anthropology Newsletter January Issue. P. 8. 
 2003	“Lilly White Feminism and Academic Apartheid in Israel.” Anthropology Newsletter, October Issue, pp. 10–11. 
 1991	“Arrival of the New Cultured Tenants: Soviet Immigration to Israel and the Displacing of the Sephardi Jews.” The Times Literary Supplement 4602:11, 14 June.

Selected video lectures 

2018	“Ahoti (=Sistah): Portraits of Mizrahi Feminists #1.” Noemie Serfaty short video, San Francisco. 17 December.
2015	"Wrapped in the Flag of Israel: Mizrahi Single Mothers and Bureaucratic Torture." Brown University, Watson Institute for International and Public Affairs and the Center for Middle Eastern Studies. 20 October.
2004	“Cultural Property Rights and the Racial Construction of the Mizrahi as a Trade-Mark: Notes on the Revolving Door of Israel’s Academe-Regime.” Presented in a conference, "The New IP Order,” in a 4-participant panel on “Culture and Copyright.” Haifa University. 14 June.

References

External links
 Smadar Lavie on the University of California website; includes bibliography of publications
Smadar Lavie -- Emeriti faculty members in the Sociocultural Wing of Anthropology

Israeli anthropologists
Israeli women anthropologists
Cultural anthropologists
Social anthropologists
Anthropology writers
Israeli non-fiction writers
Israeli feminists
Jewish feminists
Israeli women's rights activists
Jewish Israeli anti-racism activists
Racism in Israel
University of California, Davis faculty
University of California, Berkeley alumni
Hebrew University of Jerusalem alumni
Israeli Mizrahi Jews
Israeli people of Yemeni-Jewish descent
Israeli people of Lithuanian-Jewish descent
Living people
Year of birth missing (living people)
Academic staff of Beit Berl College
Jewish anthropologists